Mazharul Islam (1 July 1929 – 14 November 2003) was a Bangladeshi poet, folklorist, and academic. He served as the vice-chancellor of the University of Rajshahi. In 1972, he was appointed as the first Director General of Bangla Academy.

Education and career
Islam obtained his PhD in Bengali literature in 1958 and another Ph.D. in folklore studies from Indiana University in 1963.

Personal life and legacy
Islam was married to Nurjahan Mazhar. Together they had two sons and two daughters. His four children are Merina Jahan Kabita, a member of the Bangladesh Awami League Central Committee and imcumbent member of Jatiya Sangsad (2021-present), Choyon Islam, a prominent industrialist and former Member of Parliament (2008–2014), Dr Chanda Islam, professor of Murray State University and Shovon Islam, a prominent computer scientist and one of the leading industrialists of Bangladesh.

In 2009, "Mazharul Islam Kabita Puruskar", an annual award to inspiring poets, was introduced by Islam's family.

References

1929 births
2003 deaths
Vice-Chancellors of the University of Rajshahi
20th-century Bangladeshi poets
Bangladeshi folklorists
Academic staff of the University of Rajshahi
Indiana University alumni
Place of birth missing
Bangladeshi male poets
20th-century male writers
Bangladesh Krishak Sramik Awami League central committee members